Abacetus humeratus is a species of ground beetle in the subfamily Pterostichinae. It was described by Straneo in 1957.

References

humeratus
Beetles described in 1957